Mike Wunderlich (born 25 March 1986) is a German professional footballer who plays for  club Viktoria Köln as an attacking midfielder.

Career

Early career
Wunderlich began his career playing for the youth academy of FC Viktoria Köln, until 2004 when he transferred to 1. FC Köln. After one year playing for the FC's youth academy, he was called up to the reserve team in 2005. In 2006, Wunderlich made his senior debut in Regionalliga match against VfB Lübeck. He would go on to play fifteen more matches that season. After playing all but two of 1. FC Köln's Regionalliga matches in the first half of the 2008–09 season, he transferred to Rot-Weiss Essen, another Regionalliga team.

Rot-Weiss Essen and FSV Frankfurt
Wunderlich would play one and a half season for Essen, before joining second division club FSV Frankfurt over the summer break in 2010. He seemed to have found his footing in Frankfurt, playing very well in the 2010–11 season. However, after the season, he requested to be sent back (on loan) to the fifth-league tier of Viktoria Köln to help him recover from burn out.

Viktoria Köln 
In early 2012 he stated that he was not up to handling the pressures of professional football, and asked to remain with Viktoria Köln. His outstanding performance helped Viktoria Köln to be promoted to the newly formed Regionalliga (fourth league) at the end of the 2011–12 season, and get off to a very good start to the 2012–13 season.

Wunderlich was the top scorer of the 2016–17 Regionalliga West season with 29 goals as Viktoria finished as champions, thus qualifying for the promotion play-offs. He scored from the penalty-spot in the first leg of the club play-off tie against FC Carl Zeiss Jena but it was not enough as they lost on away goals after a 3–3 aggregate result.

Wunderlich was restricted to just 16 matches during the 2018–19 Regionalliga season but contributed 10 goals as Viktoria again secured the Regionalliga West championship and this time won promotion to the 3. Liga.

1. FC Kaiserslautern 
In June 2021 it was announced Wunderlich would join 3. Liga side 1. FC Kaiserslautern for the 2021–22 season.

Return to Viktoria Köln
On 14 December 2022, the return of Wunderlich to Viktoria Köln on 1 January 2023 was announced.

Honours
Viktoria Köln
 Regionalliga West: 2016–17, 2018–19
 Middle Rhine Cup: 2013–14, 2014–15, 2015–16, 2017–18

Individual
 Regionalliga West top scorer: 2016–17

References

External links
 
 

1986 births
Living people
Footballers from Cologne
Association football midfielders
German footballers
1. FC Köln II players
Rot-Weiss Essen players
FSV Frankfurt players
FC Viktoria Köln players
1. FC Kaiserslautern players
2. Bundesliga players
Regionalliga players
3. Liga players